Worthington Senior High School is a public high school in Worthington, Minnesota, United States, in the southwest corner of the state.  Worthington Senior High School is in Class AA of the Minnesota State High School League. The current campus is located on Clary Street, adjacent to the Independent School District #518 building on Marine Avenue.

Academics 
WHS also offers Advanced Placement classes, including AP Calculus, AP Biology and AP Psychology.  Honors and College Bound classes are offered in the core areas of the curriculum, and students in their junior and senior years are able to enroll in Post Secondary Enrollment Options (PSEO) courses at Minnesota West Community and Technical College.

Athletics 

Worthington Trojans athletic teams include baseball, basketball, cheerleading, cross country, football, golf, gymnastics, hockey, soccer, softball, tennis, track and field, volleyball, and wrestling.
Worthington High School is a member of the Big South Conference.

Notable alumni
 Wendell Butcher, NFL football player
 Matt Entenza, former minority leader of the Minnesota House of Representatives (2002–2006) and a 2010 Minnesota Democratic-Farmer-Labor Party candidate for governor of Minnesota
 Don Frerichs, businessman and Minnesota state representative
 Peter Ludlow, prominent analytic philosopher
 Lee Nystrom, NFL football player
 Tim O'Brien, author of The Things They Carried

References

External links 
 
  Independent School District 518 website.

Public high schools in Minnesota
Schools in Nobles County, Minnesota